Kaloor is a downtown region in the city of Kochi, in the state of Kerala, India. Kaloor Junction is also the name of a major intersection in this part of the city, intersecting the two major arteries of downtown Kochi, namely Banerji Road and the Kaloor-Kadavanthra Road. The nearest major intersections are Palarivattom to the east and Lissie Junction to the west.

Kaloor is especially notable for being home to the largest stadium in the state, Jawaharlal Nehru Stadium. The stadium plays host to cricket and football tournaments and was one of the venues of the U-17 FIFA World Cup which was held in October 2017. Kaloor is also home to the Regional Centre of the Indira Gandhi National Open University (IGNOU). The suburb leads directly to the temple town suburb of Elamakkara and is the birthplace of noted Malayalam poet Vylopillil Sreedhara Menon. It is well connected to all suburbs in Kochi and outlying areas and has its own bus terminus. The nearest railway station is Ernakulam North Station. The Ernakulam South Junction Railway Station and the state run KSRTC bus stand are also at reachable distance. The Kochi Metro has a station located at Kaloor Junction, making it easily accessible from both Aluva and Tripunithura sides of the city.

Mathrubhumi and Deshabhimani, two of Kerala's biggest media houses also have their head office around the vicinity of Kaloor. The famous shrine of St. Antony is also situated in Kaloor. It holds its weekly novenas every Tuesdays, for which devotees of all faiths come from far and wide. The Kaloor market is also among the biggest in Kochi and is famous for the fresh produce and variety of meat and vegetables that are stocked by its merchants.

In recent years, Kaloor has become a favorite hangout joint of youngsters, with the opening of numerous boutique cafes, hip ice cream parlors and specialty restaurants.

Educational Institutions near by
Indira Gandhi National Open University - Regional Centre
Greets Public School
Seventh-day Adventist Higher Secondary School, Kochi
ACS Higher Secondary English Medium School, ACS School Road, Kaloor
Model Technical Higher Secondary School, Kaloor
SMEClabs Industrial Automation Instrumentation Training Institution, Research and Development Division of SMEC Automation Pvt Ltd.

Location

Suburbs of Kaloor

On Perandoor Road
 Pottakkuzhi and Elamakkara
 Pavakkulam Temple, Da'wa Masjid and Little Flower Church
 South Indian Bank and Nehan Tourism

On Edappally Road
 Deshabimani Jn, Palarivattom, Mamangalam, Edappally and Lulu Mall
 Kalamassery, Aluva, Nedumbassery (Cochin Airport) and Angamaly

On High Court Road
 North Railway Station, Kacherippadi, MG Road, Albert's College and High Court
 Marine Drive, Menaka and Boat Jetty
 Law College, Cochin Corporation Office, General Hospital and Maharajas College

On Kadavanthra Road
 Kathrukadavu, Vinayaka and Kadavanthra
 KP Vallon Road and Panampally Nagar
 South Railway Station and Vyttila

Gallery

References

Neighbourhoods in Kochi